The Believer is a 2021 American horror film written and directed by Shan Serafin. It stars Aidan Bristow, Sophie Kargman, Susan Wilder, Lindsay Ginter, Robbie Goldstein and Billy Zane. It runs for 91 minutes. The film is about a woman driven murderously insane by a mad doctor's strange alternative therapy.

Synopsis
An out-of-work nuclear scientist, struggles with tension in his marriage after his wife mysteriously terminates her pregnancy without his consent. As his physical health begins to inexplicably deteriorate, his wife's behavior grows increasingly bizarre and he seeks clarity from his therapist. Exhausted by his job search, strange events begin to occur in the home and his medical condition progressively declines. Dr. Benedict recommends they try an alternative therapy, but it only makes matters worse. Lucas questions Benedict's effectiveness as his grip on reality begins to fade. Violet arouses his ever-deepening suspicions, and after a visit from two mysterious guests, her insidious behavior becomes disturbingly pervasive. Lucas' anger and frustration turns to fear as Violet's sinister intentions are revealed. Lucas tries in vain to escape the evil web she has spun, but by the time he discovers the truth, it might be too late.

Cast
 Aidan Bristow as Lucas
 Sophie Kargman as Violet
 Susan Wilder as Charlotte
 Lindsay Ginter as Gus
 Robbie Goldstein
 Billy Zane as Dr. Benedict

Release
Freestyle Releasing releases The Believer On-Demand on April 2, 2021.

Reception
Alex Saveliev of Film Threat gave it a five out of ten and he wrote:

References

External links
 

2021 films
American horror films
2021 horror films
Films about scientists
Films impacted by the COVID-19 pandemic
2020s English-language films
2020s American films